Salif Cissé (born 17 June 1994) is a German footballer who plays for FK Pirmasens.

References

External links

1994 births
Living people
German footballers
German people of Senegalese descent
SV Elversberg players
SV Saar 05 Saarbrücken players
FK Pirmasens players
3. Liga players
Association football midfielders
Sportspeople from Neunkirchen, Saarland